Mount Markab is a striking mountain in Antarctica, with a pointed peak which provides a notable landmark. The mountain was named by the UK Antarctic Place-Names Committee after the star Markab in the constellation of Pegasus.

References

Mountains of Palmer Land